Blake Hall is a country house and gardens in the village and civil parish of Bobbingworth, near Chipping Ongar, Essex.

The house incorporates an original fabric dating from the 17th century or older, but was largely rebuilt in the 18th century and later remodelled by George Basevi in 1822. It has been home to the Capel Cure family for over 200 years.

After the operations centre at nearby RAF North Weald for Sector E, No. 11 Group RAF was bombed by the Luftwaffe in September 1940 during the Battle of Britain, floors and interior walls from a portion of Blake Hall were removed, and a new "ops room" (operations room) substituted.

The Grade II* listed building is now set within its own conservation area.

Part of the railway to Ongar, opened in 1865, ran through land belonging to the Blake Hall estate, and a station called Blake Hall was named after the hall, even though the station was more than a mile to the south-west of the house itself. Latterly on the Central line of the London Underground, Blake Hall station closed in 1981.

References 

Country houses in Essex
Grade II* listed buildings in Essex
Grade II* listed houses
Grade II listed parks and gardens in Essex